Hamide Bıkçın Çetiner (born January 24, 1978) formerly known as Hamide Bıkçın Tosun is a female Turkish Taekwondo athlete, who competed in the Women's 49–57 kg weight class at the 2000 Summer Olympics held in Sydney, Australia and won the bronze medal.

Bıkçın took up taekwondo already aged eight. After winning the European and World championships, she married and became mother of a  daughter, Zeynep. Hamide Bıkçın Tosun suspended her active fighting sports life in the years 1996 and 1997. She started again 1998 to perform taekwondo and represented Turkey at the 2000 Olympics.

Achievements

 1995 World Taekwondo Championships in the Philippines – gold (Flyweight)
 2000 13th European Seniors Taekwondo Championships in Patras, Greece – gold (Bantamweight)
 2000 Summer Olympics in Sydney, Australia – bronze
 2002 7th Universiade in Berkeley, California, U.S. – gold (58 kg)
 2002 Taekwondo Belgian Open in Lommel, Belgium – gold (Bantamweight)
 2004 15th European Seniors Taekwondo Championships in Lilehammer, Norway – silver (Featherweight)

References

External links

1978 births
Turkish female taekwondo practitioners
Olympic taekwondo practitioners of Turkey
Olympic bronze medalists for Turkey
Taekwondo practitioners at the 2000 Summer Olympics
Living people
Olympic medalists in taekwondo
Turkish female martial artists
Istanbul Büyükşehir Belediyespor athletes
Medalists at the 2000 Summer Olympics
World Taekwondo Championships medalists
European Taekwondo Championships medalists
20th-century Turkish sportswomen
21st-century Turkish sportswomen